DXEJ-TV is a commercial television station owned by GMA Network Inc. Its transmitter is located at Mount Palpalan, Pagadian City. The station started operations in 1995 as the first television station in Zamboanga Peninsula.

GMA TV-3 Pagadian current programs
 One Mindanao (simulcast on TV-5 Davao)
 At Home with GMA Regional TV (simulcast on TV-5 Davao)
 Biyaheng DO30 (simulcast on TV-5 Davao)

See also
List of GMA Network stations

GMA Network stations
Television stations in Zamboanga del Sur
Television channels and stations established in 1995